Jodi Miller (born May 8, 1971), is an American stand-up comedian, writer, actress, and author known for appearing on the 9th season of America's Got Talent.

Personal life 
Jodi Miller was born in New Jersey.

In February 2021, she adopted a daughter, McKenzie Jack.

Career
Miller has appeared as a reoccurring guest commentator on CNN’s Showbiz Tonight and as the host of the news parody show NewsBusted. She has performed on Comics Unleashed, The Tonight Show, Comedy Central, and Gotham Comedy Live.

She was a writer on the Cinemax series Co-Ed Confidential and is the co-author of the book series WTF with Gregory Bergman (WTF? College; WTF? Work; WTF? Women; SRSLY, WTF; WTF? America; and OMG! Guys).

On April 8, 2016, Miller released a comedy album entitled No Child Left Behind on iTunes. She also appears on the comic game show Funny You Should Ask and hosts the show The World's Funniest Weather.

References

External links
Jodi Miller Website

American people of Jewish descent
Actresses from New Jersey
American stand-up comedians
American television actresses
American television writers
American women comedians
America's Got Talent contestants
Living people
People from New Jersey
People from Los Angeles
Writers from Los Angeles
Comedians from California
1971 births
Screenwriters from California
21st-century American comedians
American women television writers
21st-century American screenwriters
21st-century American actresses